William Henry "Harry" Butler  (25 March 1930 – 11 December 2015) was an Australian naturalist and environmental consultant, best known as the presenter of the popular ABC television series In the Wild from 1976 to 1981. He was a household name as he took viewers to remote parts of Australia observing and admiring the natural environment. Harry was a warrior for the environment and biodiversity. 

His advocacy led to the establishment of offshore islands as reserves for plants and animals, protected from invasive species. Now his legacy is being remembered with Murdoch University’s Harry Butler Institute. The new research and education facility brings science, business and the community together to address environmental problems.

He spoke highly of how Indigenous people cared for the land. Having extensive knowledge of indigenous culture and vast experience with various language groups throughout Western Australia.

Biography
Butler was born on 25 March 1930 in Perth, Western Australia. He attended Claremont Teachers College in Western Australia and later the Western State College in the United States.

Butler co-wrote "Sun Arise" with fellow Western Australian Rolf Harris; the song reached the Top 10 in the UK in 1962.

Butler was a populariser of science and natural history for both child and adult audiences, especially through the ABC television series In the Wild, which led to him being named Australian of the Year in 1979. He also authored the books In The Wild, In the Wild (Part II) and Looking at the Wild.

As conservation consultant to the Barrow Island oilfield and many other projects, Butler played a major role in environmental conservation and restoration in Australia. In 1968, he participated in the fifth of the Harold Hall Australian ornithological collecting expeditions. He lectured, and was honoured, at museums in Western Australia, Canada, and the United States. Butler was a supporter of development projects such as mining, working with corporations and state governments as an environmental consultant. 

Butler lost some popularity with his support of the construction of the Franklin River Dam in the early 1980s.

He died of cancer, aged 85, at a hospital in Perth on 11 December 2015.

Honours
In 1970, Butler was appointed an Officer of the Order of the British Empire. In 1980 this was upgraded to Commander level (CBE).

In 1979, Butler was named the Australian of the Year, jointly with Neville Bonner.

In 1993, he was awarded a cash prize for his 30 years of work with the petroleum industry.

On 4 March 2012, he was added to the National Trust of Australia's National Living Treasures list.

On 11 June 2012, he was named an Officer of the Order of Australia for "distinguished service to the community through the promotion of public understanding of natural history and wildlife conservation, to the development of collaborative environmental partnerships with industry, and to the community."

A species of mulga snake, Pseudechis butleri, and a spider, Synothele butleri, are named for Butler.

Three species of Australian lizards are named for Butler: Delma butleri, Morethia butleri, and Notoscincus butleri. Two species of Australian lizards are named for Butler and his wife, Margaret Butler: Ctenophorus butlerorum and Eremiascincus butlerorum.

On 17 April 2016, the new Western Australian Museum research facility and storage centre in Welshpool was named in his honour.

The Harry Butler Institute was established in August 2017 at Murdoch University in partnership with Chevron to help shape a new generation of leaders in conservation and environmental management.

The Harry Butler Science Centre, named in honour of the Australian environmental pioneer, was officially opened on Barrow Island in June 2018 by Chevron and Murdoch University as partners of the University’s Harry Butler Institute.

References

External links
In Conversation 27 July 2006 ABC Interview 
Australian Of The Year website- Harry Butler

1930 births
2015 deaths
Australian naturalists
People from Perth, Western Australia
Australian of the Year Award winners
Australian Commanders of the Order of the British Empire
Officers of the Order of Australia
Western Colorado University alumni
Deaths from cancer in Western Australia